In the Swiss finance industry retrocessions are kickback commissions that banks, asset managers, trustees and financial service providers receive after purchasing financial products such as funds, obligations, structured products, etc. from the distributors of the products.

Retrocessions have been heavily criticized, due to a possible conflict of interest and a lack of transparency in the past. The Swiss federal tribunal has stated on various occasions that commissions create a conflict of interest as a bank is incentivised to acquire a certain product, whereas the operation is not justified with regards to the interest of the client.

In the European Union a major transformation of the financial market has led to a number of regulations that intend to make the financial industry more transparent and accountable. Retrocessions are a type of inducement that are considered non-transparent and therefore regulators have sought a way to drastically reduce them or even ban them completely. As of 2019, inducements are completely banned in only three countries of the EU (the UK, Denmark and the Netherlands).

Broadly used synonyms for retrocessions are finder's fee, referral fee, sales commission, acquisition commission, hidden commission, or, as above mentioned, kick-back commission.

History 
Retrocessions have for many years been a well-established, common and lucrative business model for Swiss banks, asset management companies and financial service providers. According to a study published by Finalix AG, retrocessions accounted for an estimated 12.4% of the Swiss banking sector's added value in 2012., amounting to CHF 4.2 Billion. Retrocessions are a form of financial inducement that Swiss banks and asset managers received from asset managers, whose products they pushed to their wealth management clients.

Criticism

Conflicts of interest 
It is argued that banks and asset managers face a conflict of interest when buying financial products that pay a certain percentage in kick-back commissions. When deciding on which fund or  structured product to buy, the asset manager in charge should merely act in the interest of his client and hence buy the fund, share, structured product etc. with the best performance. However, as kick-back commissions vary broadly between 0.5 and 2% and in most cases are paid back to the buyer independently from the financial product's performance, the bank or asset manager might aim to maximizing profits by buying products that pay the highest retrocessions.

The BaFin, the German Federal Financial Supervisory Authority, gives the following example: “If a bank receives a commission from an issuer for the sale of certain securities, this commission and the amount of the commission may pose an incentive for the bank to allow itself to be swayed when providing investment advice to the client. The client’s interest could thus be subordinated to the bank’s interest in selling the security.

Missing disclosure of the inducements 
Another point of criticism is that banks and asset managers for years failed to disclose the amount of retrocessions received. Many banks and asset managers received retrocessions in addition to the fees charged without informing their clients sufficiently. Some made their clients sign waivers, without informing them, for what exactly they are signing the waivers for. 

The Swiss Federal Supreme Court (FSC 137 III 393) decided that an asset manager is entitled to retain retrocessions and other distribution fees received only if three rules are met: Firstly, the client has to be informed about retrocessions by defining the parameters based on which the retrocessions are calculated, and a range of the expected compensation, expressed as a percentage of the assets under management, has to be provided and has to be put into perspective with the management fees. Secondly, once the client is informed about the amount of retrocessions the asset manager will receive, the client has to sign a valid and comprehensive waiver based on the informed consent. And thirdly, the client must be informed about the risks that arise out of a conflict of interest generated by retrocessions and the measures taken by the asset manager to avoid or mitigate them.  The legislation and rules is similar in other countries.

However, as most banks and asset managers have not informed their clients sufficiently about the retrocessions generated, many clients have the right to assert their claims on retrocessions.

Independent of performance 
Retrocessions are usually not paid out or received based on the performance of the financial product; this means that even if the client's portfolio showed a negative performance, asset managers still received on the one hand their contractually agreed banking fees from the clients and on the other hand, retrocessions worth between 0.5 – 2% of the assets under management.

Argumentation in favour of retrocessions 
Banks and asset managers argue that without retrocession fees the substantial charges would have to be made to the client in order to pay for the ongoing service that the bank provides today mostly free of charge. Asset managers that retain retrocessions argue that they are needed for providing general services such as maintaining a website.

Legal Situation

Switzerland

Supreme Court Ruling 22.03.2006 
The Federal Supreme Court of Switzerland found in a major decision in 2006 (BGE 132 II 460 ff). This groundbreaking decisions stated that kickbacks distributed paid to external asset managers belong to the client and therefore have to be forwarded to them.

Supreme Court Ruling 30.10.2012 
The second Judgement of the Swiss Federal Court (4A_127/2012, 4A_141/2012) concerning retrocessions decided that banks are also not entitled to keep retrocessions received when buying in-house products for client portfolios. Such as in 2006, the possible conflict of interest was key for the Federal Supreme Court decision.

Supreme Court Ruling 16.06.2017 
The judgement (4A_508/2016) delivered by the Swiss Federal Supreme Court on 16. June 2017 clarifies the statutory limitation of retrocessions. Clients can recover retrocessions withheld by Swiss asset management companies retroactively for the last 10 years. The statutory limitation period begins on the day on which the Swiss asset management company received the retrocession.

Trade Court Ruling 15.11.2017 
HG 150054 states: Clients with execution-only-mandates also have a right to receive the retrocessions and finder's fees that were unlawfully retained by Swiss banks and asset managers.

Supreme Court Ruling 14.08.2018 
In ruling 6B_689/2016, the Swiss Federal Supreme Court held that the failure to disclose adequately retrocessions may constitute an act of criminal mismanagement.

Germany 
With the implementation of the Markets in Financial Instruments Directive (MiFID II) by the Second Financial Market Regulatory Act (2nd FiMaNoG), the transfer of funds to asset managers in Germany was set out in Section 64 (7) WpHG introduced a general ban on accepting and retaining contributions from third parties or persons acting for them. The ban has been in force since 3 January 2018. The previous exemption, according to which such allowances could be collected if they improved the quality of the services provided to the customer and were disclosed to the customer, has been dropped. Section 64 (7) sentence 4 of the WpHG now expressly provides that all monetary benefits assumed in connection with financial portfolio management are to be distributed to the customer as soon as reasonably possible after receipt and in full.

Liechtenstein 
In Liechtenstein, there is no relevant case law for the recovery of retrocessions arising from asset-liability contracts, in contrast to Switzerland. However, as in Switzerland, the contractual nature of an asset management agreement implies that the customer is entitled to all the benefits of the management of the business, including, in particular, retrocessions. The customer can demand from his asset manager the release of all retrocessions. Unlike in Switzerland, however, there is a more favorable limitation period for customers in Liechtenstein. This is 30 years, and it is therefore possible for the customer to recover retrocessions for a much longer period of time.

United Kingdom 
The UK is besides Denmark and The Netherlands the only European country to prohibit inducements completely. UK's Financial Conduct Authority (FCA) introduced this measure to end conflicts of interest, increase transparency and strengthen the professional qualifications of advisors.

Who is affected? 
Investor rights’ specialists claim that anybody who held investments with a Swiss bank, asset management company or trustee under an asset management contract, investment consulting contract or a pure account/depot-relationship (execution only contract) are affected by unlawfully withheld retrocessions and able to demand repayment.

There are no official numbers stating the exact number of clients of Swiss banks and asset management companies that are effected by unlawfully withheld retrocessions. According to estimations there are at least 120’000 affected German investors, likely more than 40'000 affected French investors and approximately 40'000 affected Austrian investors

Claiming back retrocessions 
So far, no Swiss bank has published an official guideline on how to claim back unlawfully withheld retrocessions. On the contrary, banks largely ignore the topic, tell their clients that they have no right to assert their claims or even leave requests unanswered.

Although the legal situation on retrocessions is clear private investors are almost chanceless when claiming kick-back commissions back from Swiss banks. Therefore, some Swiss service providers such as Liti-Link AG and LEGAFUND have specialized on recovering claims on retrocessions for private and institutional investors before they expire (10 year statute of limitations), without risk and with a high chance of success.

References 

Financial services in Switzerland